The Great Lakes St. Lawrence Seaway Development Corporation (GLS) is an agency of the United States Department of Transportation that operates and maintains the U.S.-owned and operated facilities of the joint United States-Canadian St. Lawrence Seaway.  It operates 2 of the 15 locks of the Seaway between Montreal and Lake Erie. The corporation also works to develop trade across the larger seaway system, which includes the Great Lakes as well as the St. Lawrence Seaway.

The corporation was formerly named the St. Lawrence Seaway Development Corporation (SLSDC), but was renamed in the 2021 Consolidated Appropriations Act to recognize the corporation's trade development work in the connected Great Lakes region.

Its Canadian counterpart is the St. Lawrence Seaway Management Corporation, a non-profit corporation under Canadian law.

President Joe Biden appointed Adam Tindall-Schlicht to the role of GLS administrator on November 6, 2022.

List of administrators

See also
Title 33 of the Code of Federal Regulations
List of navigation authorities in the United States

References

External links
 St. Lawrence Seaway Development Corporation
 Saint Lawrence Seaway Development Corporation in the Federal Register

Development Corporation
United States Department of Transportation agencies